Sunday Morning Live may refer to:

Sunday Morning Live (UK TV programme), a  British religious discussion programme that airs on BBC One
CNN Sunday Morning, an American news program, sometimes referred to as Sunday Morning Live, that airs on CNN

See also
Sunday Live, a Scottish current affairs programme
Sunday Live with Adam Boulton, a Sky News discussion programme